Little Para Reservoir is a reservoir in South Australia serving the city of Adelaide. It was built between 1974 and 1977, costing A$11.5 million, and commissioned in January 1979.

The reservoir is built in the path of the Little Para River and is used for water storage and flood mitigation. As the Little Para's catchment is insufficient to fill the reservoir, it is mainly used to store water pumped from the River Murray. Periodically water is released from the reservoir into the river, enabling refreshing of ground water.

Overlooking the reservoir is a public park with tennis courts, playgrounds, public toilets and information about the initial construction of the dam. Although much of the current amenities have fallen into disarray due lack of maintenance and public abuse.

2008 upgrade
Construction of a new fusegate spillway system was also carried out. Complaints were raised that "millions of litres of water" were released into the ocean until the reservoir was at 68 percent to enable the construction to proceed.

 the reservoir is closed to the public, due to the 2008 upgrade.

See also 
 List of reservoirs and dams in Australia

References 

Dams completed in 1977
Dams in South Australia
Reservoirs in South Australia